The 39th Mechanized Infantry Division is an infantry formation of the Turkish Land Forces.

In 1941 it was part of XVII Corps at Maras. It was deployed from the mainland to Cyprus for the Turkish invasion of Cyprus in 1974, under Major General Bedrettin Demirel. On landing it immediately became involved in the Battle of Pentemili beachhead.

Since the 1970s it has formed part of 11th Corps/Cyprus Turkish Peace Forces. Necdet Ozel commanded the division from 1999 for two-three years.

References

External links
Permanent Representative of Cyprus, 2007 letter to Secretary-General 

Mechanized divisions of Turkey